Sidney McCutchin (1870 – 1946) was a Jamaican cricketer. He played in one first-class match for the Jamaican cricket team in 1894/95.

See also
 List of Jamaican representative cricketers

References

External links
 

1870 births
1960 deaths
Jamaican cricketers
Jamaica cricketers
Place of birth missing